Ahmad Al-Assir (Arabic: أحمد الأسير, born 5 May 1968) is a Lebanese former Sunni Imam of the Bilal Bin Rabah Mosque in Sidon, who became an ex-leader of an Islamist group, that attacked the Lebanese Army in 2013 in Saida. He is considered by some to be a Salafi.

With his increasing involvement in regional politics, especially after the Syrian Civil War, he has become a notorious personality in Lebanon's political landscape, and frequently agitated against Iran and Hezbollah

After being a wanted fugitive for years, Al-Assir was detained on 15 August 15, 2015 by Lebanese General Security officials while attempting to flee to Egypt using a forged passport in Beirut International Airport. Upon his capture, it was revealed that he had undergone physical changes in appearance and attire; with a shaved beard and new clothing style and facial modifications suggesting the use of plastic surgery. On 28 September 2017, Al-Assir was sentenced to death.

Background
Al-Assir is from a mixed background - his mother is a Shia from the south of Lebanon, and his father is a Sunni from Sidon. He came from a non-religious artistic home, but later convinced his father not to play music. He has two wives and three children. According to one of his sisters, he was once a supporter of Hezbollah, but withdrew his support when Hezbollah and the Lebanese Shiite withdrew their focus from Israel and begun to exert excessive force on the delicate sectarian balance of Lebanon.

Assir's notoriety increased after a series of sermons and public exhibitions criticizing Hezbollah, a once untouchable symbol in the Lebanese political landscape. He also caused controversy by openly criticizing figures within the militia such as secretary general and spokesperson Sayed Hassan Nasrallah. Many of his speeches are critical of Hezbollah's, Iran's and the Arab Baath Party's support for Syrian President Bashar Al-Asad. Assir has stated that he is only against Shias that follow the teachings of Khomeini. Assir has attempted to become a leader of the Sunnis of Lebanon, without success. Currently he is not considered a mainstream Sunni Scholar; however, his aggressive and emotional rhetoric against Hezbollah's intervention in Syria has gained him headlines and controversy, along with attracting many supporters and followers disillusioned with the traditionally Sunni Future Movement party and the leadership of Saad Hariri.

2012 sit-ins
In August 2012, Al-Assir and his supporters staged a sit in in the southern city of Sidon to protest against Hezbollah's weaponry. This led to tensions, and later clashes between Assir-supporters and members of the Popular Nasserist Organization. An AFP photographer was beaten by security forces during the clashes. The following day, counter-protests were held by members of the PNO.

On 8 August, a gunfight between supporters and rivals of Assir wounded five, including two women.

Access to the media

As Lebanon is a freedom of speech country, every Lebanese was able or obliged to hear Assir speech. Some media went far in hosting him in their studios in particular Marcel Ghanem who hosted him in his political talk show Kalam El-Nas. Some Lebanese criticized the fact that Assir was given a media platform despite his provocative speeches and referred to the fact that Bin Laden was not able to speech on CNN or Fox News despite that the United States is a freedom of speech country.

Attacking other religions
Assir has usually provocative speeches attacking Shias. His hate touched also other religions especially the Christians and he expressed it in a public preaching: Our mind is forgiveness and selves-control. How can an engineer pray for a cow or an atomic scientist worship rats or trees and this one worships Jesus and the other worships a rock and fire and hell. Where will they go when they die? This is our matter.

Military Clashes

2012 Sidon clash
On 11 November 2012, three people were killed and four others wounded after supporters of Assir clashed with supporters of Hezbollah in the southern city of Sidon. Assir stated "We have a blood score to settle with Hezbollah that can only be settled with blood", and that he considered forming an "armed resistance group" to defend Lebanon from Israel as he believed that Hezbollah's weapons had now been pointed internally.

Syrian civil war
In April 2013, Assir urged his followers to join the Syrian rebels by claiming that "There is now no other choice but to defend our (Sunni) people in Syria," and assuring that "There is a religious duty on every Muslim who is able to do so... to enter into Syria in order to defend its people, its mosques and religious shrines, especially in Qusayr and Homs," adding that "This fatwa (religious decree) affects us all, especially those who have military experience." Assir also announced the establishment of "Free resistance battalions" in Sidon. Such announcements came after there was enough evidence that Hezbollah militias had been involved in Syria who were fighting alongside Bashar's army.

2013 Sidon clashes

In June 2013, clashes broke out in an eastern suburb of Sidon after several people attacked, threw stones and shattered windows in a car belonging to Assir's brother, Amjad al-Assir. Assir then gave Hezbollah a one-week ultimatum to vacate apartments occupied by the group's supporters in the mostly Sunni city, as clashes broke out with gunmen wielding automatic rifles and rocket-propelled grenades. Officials stated that the gunmen fighting Assir's followers were believed to be Hezbollah sympathizers.

Lebanese army troops deployed in the area of the fighting, which subsided after several hours. The military called on gunmen loyal to Assir to withdraw immediately from the streets whilst ignoring the presence of Hezbollah gunmen.

A group of Assir's followers were believed to stage armed attacks on several civil apartments in Saida, which were reportedly identified as Hezbollah offices. Some Lebanese saw the attacks as highlights of a series of provocations initiated by Saudi and Qatar-backed Sunni fundamentalists whilst many others believed Iran was the real reason for the provocations.

On 23 June 2013, according to news channels loyal to Hezbollah said that 10 Lebanese Army soldiers were killed and 35 wounded in a clash with armed men loyal to Assir, in Sidon at an Army post near the Abra complex that houses the Bilal bin Rabah Mosque. Other Lebanese news channels denied this and accused Hezbollah militias of being involved. Violence started with a deadly attack on an army checkpoint. Roads were later blocked in other parts of the country, and the army came under fire in the Ain el-Hilweh camp.

During 23–24 June 2013, heavy street fighting erupted between the Lebanese Army and gunmen loyal to Assir in Sidon as they were accused of provoking the attack. Sixteen Lebanese soldiers, thirteen Assir supporters and approximately 4 Hezbollah militants were killed. A bodyguard of a cleric, who tried to reach the fighting to negotiate a ceasefire, also died. More than 100 Lebanese soldiers were wounded, as well as 13 pro-Assir militants. The Lebanese army requested for the country's politicians to intervene. On Monday June 24, 2013, Lebanese Army commandos seized a complex controlled by gunmen loyal to Assir in the southern city of Sidon, shortly after he fled the premises to an unknown destination.

Assir reportedly fled the complex at around 10 a.m., shortly after the Army stormed the premises which the military gradually gained control over throughout the day. Sources said soldiers were still trading gunfire with snipers located on the rooftops of nearby buildings. Sixty-five gunmen, including several Palestinian and Syrian refugees, reportedly either surrendered or were captured by Army units during the raid on the complex. Lebanon's military prosecutor issued arrest warrants against Assir and 123 of his followers. The warrants also included the name of Assir's brother.

The raid on the compound at noon came after an attempt by a group of Salafi preachers to mediate a truce reached a dead end, with the Army determined to continue its operations. There is no factual basis for the claim that Assir was captured and his followers crushed. His fate remains unknown, however, the army is treating the matter as a capture or kill operation on the basis that they believe it was only Assir that killed Lebanese soldiers in "cold blood", according to a military statement.

Military Court prosecution
In February 2014, it was reported that military courts were seeking the death penalty for Ahmed al-Assir, and prison terms for up to 20 of his followers. According to Lebanese authorities, al-Assir was arrested at Beirut airport in August 2015. On 28 September 2017, the Lebanese Military Courts declared the verdict of death penalty for Assir.

References

1968 births
Critics of Shia Islam
Lebanese Islamists
Lebanese prisoners and detainees
Lebanese Salafis
Lebanese Sunni clerics
Living people
People from Sidon
Prisoners and detainees of Lebanon